For other places with the same name, see Wazirabad (disambiguation)

Sarai Kale Khan is a village in South East Delhi district in Delhi. This is a Gurjar village of clan Basista/Bosatta. This place is remotely connected to other parts of Delhi through the means of Delhi Metro Pink Line (Delhi Metro). It also has Inter-State Bus Terminus. It is adjacent to the Hazrat Nizamuddin Railway Station. It is one of the five main stations in Delhi and is the originating and terminal station for 60 trains. Sarai Kale Khan is the terminus for most buses heading for towns south of Delhi. It is also a DTC bus depot for the Mudrika Seva (Ring Road Bus Service) and many other bus routes.

History
The sarai itself named after a Sufi saint, Kale Khan of 14th–15th century, whose resting place along with that of another Sufi saint of Delhi, resting place of travelers is today situated inside the Delhi Airport complex. Though a Lodi era structure Kale Khan ka Gumad is also situated at Kotla Mubarakpur Complex in South Delhi, the tomb is dated to 1481 AD as per an inscription on the Mihrab inside the tomb, this Kale Khan was a courtier in the Lodi period during the reign of Bahlol Lodi

Nawab Faizullah Beg, son of Nawab Qasim Jan, a courtier in reign of Mughal Emperor, Shah Alam II (r. 1728–1806), was a courtier in Bahadur Shah Zafar's reign, and built a complex later known as Ahata Kaley Sahab, so named a saint named Kaley Khan, who lived here for a while, after whom area was later named. The complex was later acquired by Bunyadi Begum, poet Mirza Ghalib's sister-in-law, and housed the poet after he was released from debtors' prison.

The name Sarai derives from the time of the rule of the Afghan Sher Shah Suri, under whom a paved road network was built, with roadside inns called "Serais" every twelve miles.

Sarai Kale Khan Inter-State bus terminus
Sarai Kale Khan Inter-State Bus Terminus  is a major bus terminus complex in Delhi, India catering to bus services to Haryana and Rajasthan states.

References

External links
 Sarai Kale Khan at wikimapia
 What’s in a name?  (History behind the name) at The Hindu

Neighbourhoods in Delhi
Caravanserais in India